Unna West is a railway station in the Unna district of Massen in the German state of North Rhine-Westphalia. It is classified by Deutsche Bahn as a category 6 station. It was opened on 3 June 1984 on the Fröndenberg–Kamen railway completed between Unna and Unna-Königsborn by the Prussian state railways on 1 April 1900 and electrified on 25 May 1984.

It is served by Rhine-Ruhr S-Bahn line S 4 at 30-minute intervals.

The station is also served by bus routes C41 (Unna + Massen - Holzwickede - Dortmund Airport) and R51 (Unna + Massen - Wickede - Holzwickede - Opherdicke) of Verkehrsgesellschaft Kreis Unna, both at 60-minute intervals.

References

S4 (Rhine-Ruhr S-Bahn)
Rhine-Ruhr S-Bahn stations
Railway stations in Germany opened in 1984
Unna